Charles Bernhard is an American pair skater. With partner Katie Barnhart, he is the 1997 U.S. junior silver medalist and 1997 Golden Spin of Zagreb champion.

Results
pairs (with Barnhart)

References

External links
 Pairs on ice profile

American male pair skaters
Living people
Year of birth missing (living people)